Ratimir or Ratmir or Racimir (Polish), is a Slavic origin given name meaning "defender of peace". In Serbian the diminutive of Ratimir is Ratko.

Notable people with the name include:

 Ratimir, Duke of Lower Pannonia
 Ratomir Dujković, a Serbian football manager and a former player
 Ratimir Martinović, Montenegrin pianist
 Ratmir Kholmov, a Russian chess Grandmaster
 Ratmir Shameyev (1988–2011), rebel leader in the North Caucasus insurgency 
 Ratmir Timashev (born 1966), Russian IT entrepreneur 
 Ratmir, character in Pushkin's poem Ruslan and Ludmila 

Slavic masculine given names
Belarusian masculine given names
Bulgarian masculine given names
Croatian masculine given names
Czech masculine given names
Macedonian masculine given names
Montenegrin masculine given names
Slovak masculine given names
Slovene masculine given names
Polish masculine given names
Russian masculine given names
Serbian masculine given names
Ukrainian masculine given names